Ivana Jakupčević Marinković (born 10 April 1977) is a Croatian former competitive figure skater. She competed at the 1998 Winter Olympics in Nagano and finished 25th. Jakupčević qualified for the free skate at the 1998 European Championships in Milan and at the 2000 World Championships in Nice. After retiring from competition, she began coaching in Zagreb.

Competitive highlights

References 

1977 births
Croatian female single skaters
Living people
Sportspeople from Zagreb
Figure skaters at the 1998 Winter Olympics
Olympic figure skaters of Croatia
Competitors at the 2001 Winter Universiade
20th-century Croatian women